Daniel Neil (born 13 December 2001) is an English professional footballer who plays as a midfielder for Sunderland.

Career
Born in South Shields, Neil grew up as  Sunderland fan, and a began his career with the club after a stint with Hebburn Town Juniors.

He made his senior debut on 13 November 2018, in the EFL Trophy, appearing as a late substitute in injury time. Neil scored his first professional goal when he scored against Accrington Stanley on 11 September 2021 in a 2–1 win.

In December 2021 and January 2022 he was linked with possible transfers to Premier League clubs Burnley and Aston Villa, however he remained with Sunderland. This speculation came off of the back of Neil being awarded the EFL Young Player of the Month award for December 2021.

International career
On 11 November 2021, Neil made his England U20 debut during a 2–0 defeat to Portugal in the 2021–22 Under 20 Elite League.

Career statistics

Honours
Sunderland
EFL Trophy: 2020–21

Individual
EFL Young Player of the Month: December 2021

References

2001 births
Living people
English footballers
Footballers from South Shields
Association football midfielders
Hebburn Town F.C. players
Sunderland A.F.C. players
English Football League players
England youth international footballers